Matthew Angelo Harrison (born 1989) is an American artist living and working in Detroit, MI. His work investigates analog and digital technologies to explore ancestry, authenticity, and the relationship between African culture and African-American culture.

Life and work
Harrison was born in Detroit, Michigan, where he currently lives and works. After earning a BFA from the School of the Art Institute of Chicago in 2012, Harrison worked at Ford Motor Company prototyping clay models for cars and car parts. His past work with machinery and industrial design continues to inform and inspire his artistic process today. In his work, Harrison explores issues of race, design, mortality and industry by making use of various technologies. Inspired by the notion of an “abstract ancestry,” Harrison focuses on collecting relics and symbols of African American culture that can be re-contextualized or re-simulated.

Bodies of Work

In his "Dark Silhouettes" series, Harrison “encapsulates” dissections of African tribal sculptures in subtly tinted resin blocks. Some of the figures, heads and masks come from Makonde and Dogon tribes while others are of unknown origin. Harrison then slices through or burrows holes, with a CNC router, into some of the blocks producing unique forms and evoking diverse places and times.

In his “Dark Povera” series, Harrison scans African artifacts and then reproduces them with his homemade low-resolution 3D printers. In contrast to most 3D printers, which print with silicone and other strong synthetic plastics, Harrison’s hand-made printers utilize a wet clay, creating a finished product that is an imperfect, abstracted reproduction of the original artifact.

Exhibitions 
Solo exhibitions

 Detroit City/Detroit Affinities, curated by Jens Hoffmann, MOCAD, Detroit, MI, 2016
 Dark Povera Part 1, Atlanta Contemporary, Atlanta, GA, 2017
 Post Truth / The Lie That Tells the Truth, Culture Lab, Detroit, MI, 2017
 'Prototype of Dark Silhouettes, Jessica Silverman Gallery, San Francisco, CA, 2018
 'Abstract Ancestry: Machine Works on Paper, University of Michigan Institute for the Humanities, Ann Arbor, MI, 2018
 Field Station: Matthew Angelo Harrison, Broad Museum, Michigan State University, East Lansing, MI, 2018

Group exhibitions

 Ever get the feeling we’re not alone in this world?, What Pipeline, Detroit, MI, 2016
 The Politics of Portraiture, Jessica Silverman Gallery, San Francisco, CA, 2016
 Take Me (I’m Yours), curated by Hans Ulrich Obrist, Jens Hoffmann and Kelly Taxter, Jewish Museum, New York, NY, 2016
 Eric Schmid is an Idiot, curated by What Pipeline, CAVE Detroit, MI, 2017
 Sonic Rebellion: Music as Resistance, MOCAD, Detroit, MI, 2017
 Fictions, The Studio Museum in Harlem, New York, NY, 2017
 The Everywhere Studio, Institute of Contemporary Art, Miami, FL, 2017
 Songs for Sabotage, New Museum Triennial, New Museum, New York, NY, 2018
 At Large Part 2, Reyes Projects, Detroit, MI, 2018
 I Was Raised on the Internet, Museum of Contemporary Art Chicago, Chicago, IL, 2018
 Kinship, Jessica Silverman Gallery, San Francisco, CA, 2018
 Uncanny Valley, De Young Museum, San Francisco, CA, 2019
 Landlord Colors: On Art, Economy, and Materiality, Cranbrook Museum, Bloomfield Hills, MI, 2019
 Colored People Time: Quotidian Pasts, Institute of Contemporary Art, University of Pennsylvania, Philadelphia, PA, 2019

Public collections 

 Museum of Contemporary Art, Chicago, IL
 Broad Art Museum, Michigan State University, East Lansing, MI
 Galeries Lafayette Foundation - Fonds de dotation Famille Moulin, Paris  
 de Young Museum, San Francisco, CA
 Institute of Contemporary Art, Miami, FL
 Kadist, San Francisco/Paris
 Rennie Collection, Vancouver, B.C.

References

1989 births
Living people
21st-century American artists
Artists from Detroit
School of the Art Institute of Chicago alumni
21st-century African-American artists
20th-century African-American people